Maurits De Schrijver (born 26 June 1951 in Aalst) is a retired Belgian footballer.

Career
During his career he played for Lokeren.

De Schrijver made his debut for Belgium in a May 1982 friendly match against Denmark and has earned a total of 4 caps, scoring no goals. He has represented his country at the 1982 FIFA World Cup. His final international was a December 1982 UEFA Euro 1984 qualifying match against Scotland.

References

External links
 Royal Belgian Football Association: Number of caps
 Profile & stats - Lokeren

1951 births
Living people
Sportspeople from Aalst, Belgium
Footballers from East Flanders
Association football defenders
Belgian footballers
Belgium international footballers
Belgian Pro League players
1982 FIFA World Cup players
K.S.C. Lokeren Oost-Vlaanderen players
Belgian football managers
S.C. Eendracht Aalst managers
K.M.S.K. Deinze managers